Unity High School is a public high school located in the village of Tolono in Champaign County, Illinois, United States. In 2007, 467 students attended the grade 9-12 school. It is the only high school in Community Unit School District (CUSD) Seven. Unity Junior High School, Unity West Elementary, and Unity East Elementary feed into UHS.

Unity is a member of the Illini Prairie Conference, an athletic conference made up of central Illinois schools with similar enrollments.  Unity had been a charter member of the Okaw Valley Conference from 1958 to 1984, before rejoining the conference in 2006.

Notable alumni 
Brian Cardinal, NBA basketball player with the Dallas Mavericks.
Rocky Ryan (American football), NFL football player with the Philadelphia Eagles and the Chicago Bears.

References

External links 
Official High School Homepage
District Homepage

Public high schools in Illinois
Schools in Champaign County, Illinois